Wechsler Scales may refer to:
 Wechsler Adult Intelligence Scale
 Wechsler Individual Achievement Test
 Wechsler Intelligence Scale for Children
 Wechsler Memory Scale
 Wechsler Preschool and Primary Scale of Intelligence
 Wechsler Test of Adult Reading